The Lockhart–Martinelli parameter is a dimensionless number used in internal two-phase flow calculations.  It expresses the liquid fraction of a flowing fluid.  Its main application is in two-phase pressure drop and boiling/condensing heat transfer calculations.

It is defined as:

 

where

 is the liquid phase mass flowrate;
 is the gas phase mass flowrate;
 is the gas density;
 is the liquid density.

See also 

 Wet gas

References 

Dimensionless numbers